Scutari High School is a private three-year high school in the ancient city of Shkodra, Albania. The school began its regular work on 20 September 2004.

The monthly tuition is 10,000 lek. An applicant must have a minimum eighty-percent eighth-grade average to be accepted.

As of June 2005, the school had around thirty students, of varying religious backgrounds.

See also 
 Jordan Misja High School

Secondary schools in Albania
2004 establishments in Albania
Buildings and structures in Shkodër
Educational institutions established in 2004
Schools in Shkodër